The Philippine Senate Committee on Public Services is a standing committee of the Senate of the Philippines.

Jurisdiction 
According to the Rules of the Senate, the committee handles all matters relating to:

 Public services and utilities
 The Department of Information and Communications Technology
 National Telecommunications Commission
 The Department of Transportation
 Grant or amendment of legislative franchises

Members, 18th Congress 
Based on the Rules of the Senate, the Senate Committee on Public Services has 13 members.

The President Pro Tempore, the Majority Floor Leader, and the Minority Floor Leader are ex officio members.

Here are the members of the committee in the 18th Congress as of September 24, 2020:

Committee secretary: Harold Ian V. Bartolome

See also 

 List of Philippine Senate committees

References 

Public Services